Miragoâne is an arrondissement in the Nippes department of Haiti. As of 2015, the population was 141,826 inhabitants. Postal codes in the Miragoâne Arrondissement start with the number 74.

The arondissement consists of the following communes:
 Miragoâne
 Fonds-des-Nègres
 Paillant
 Petite-Rivière-de-Nippes

References

Arrondissements of Haiti
Nippes